"Sure Feels Like Love" is a song written by Larry Gatlin, and recorded by American country music group Larry Gatlin & the Gatlin Brothers Band.  It was released in August 1982 as the first single and title track from their album Sure Feels Like Love. The song reached number 5 on the Billboard Hot Country Singles chart and number 1 on the RPM Country Tracks chart in Canada.

Chart performance

References

1982 singles
1982 songs
Larry Gatlin songs
Columbia Records singles
Songs written by Larry Gatlin
Song recordings produced by Jerry Crutchfield